Dark Guardian may refer to:

 Dark Guardian (novel series), a series of young-adult paranormal romance novels by Rachel Hawthorne
 Dark Guardian (novel), a paranormal/suspense novel by Christine Feehan